Solomon James Kirnon Henry (born 21 October 1983) is a Montserratian international footballer who plays as a midfielder.

Career
He has played club football for Barnet, Erith & Belvedere, Waltham Forest, Ashford Town (Kent), Leyton, St Albans City, Billericay Town, Northwood and Horsham YMCA.

He made his international debut for Montserrat in 2014.

References

1983 births
Living people
Montserratian footballers
Montserrat international footballers
Barnet F.C. players
Erith & Belvedere F.C. players
Waltham Forest F.C. players
Ashford United F.C. players
Leyton F.C. players
St Albans City F.C. players
Billericay Town F.C. players
Northwood F.C. players
Horsham YMCA F.C. players
Association football defenders
Montserratian expatriate footballers
Montserratian expatriate sportspeople in England
Expatriate footballers in England
Black British sportspeople